Atlético El Vigía Fútbol Club (usually called Atlético El Vigía) is a professional club promoted to Venezuelan league in 2007. The club is based in El Vigía, Mérida State.

Titles
Primera División Venezolana: 0
Amateur Era (0):
Professional Era (0):

Segunda División Venezolana: 3
1993, 2003, 2007

Segunda División B Venezolana: 0
Tercera División Venezolana: 0
Copa de Venezuela: 0

Current first team squad

 Lider; Jugadores de El Vigia

External links
Official Site 
Unofficial Site 

Association football clubs established in 1987
Football clubs in Venezuela
Mérida (state)
1987 establishments in Venezuela
El Vigia